St. Antony's Matriculation Higher Secondary School in Srivilliputtur, India, was founded in 1983 at 64, Vazhaikulam Street. The Director of School Education, Chennai recognized the school in 1990.

References

High schools and secondary schools in Tamil Nadu
Education in Virudhunagar district
Educational institutions established in 1983
1983 establishments in Tamil Nadu